Art of War Undisputed Arena Fighting Championship (Art of War) is a defunct U.S.-based Mixed martial arts (MMA) organization. The Art of War was headquartered in Dallas, Texas and was owned and operated by SUN Sports & Entertainment, Inc. It is not related to Chinese MMA promotion Art of War Fighting Championship.

History 

The Art of War held six events. 

The first event, Art of War 1, was on March 9, 2007, at the American Airlines Center in front of over 6,000 attendees. The headliner was Pedro Rizzo vs Justin Eilers. The fight aired on HDNET. 

Art of War 2 took place May 11, 2007 in Austin, Texas. The headliner was Chris Guillen vs Wes Sims.

The first pay-per-view Art of War 3 took place on September 1, 2007, at American Airlines Center in Dallas, Texas. The main event featured former UFC fighters Jeff Monson and Pedro Rizzo.  The fight was distributed by American Television Distribution and aired on Dish Network.

Events

References

Mixed martial arts organizations
2007 establishments in the United States
Mixed martial arts television shows